Gotch is a surname. Notable people with the surname include:

Brad Gotch (born 1962), Australian rules footballer 
Francis Gotch (1853–1913), British neurophysiologist 
Frank Gotch (1878–1917), American professional wrestler
Frank Gotch (physician) (born 1926), American physician
John Alfred Gotch (1852–1942), British architect and architectural historian
Karl Gotch (1924–2007), German professional wrestler
Simon Gotch, American professional wrestler
Tarquin Gotch, British entertainment professional
Thomas Cooper Gotch (1854–1931), English Pre-Raphaelite artist

Arts and entertainment
Masafumi Gotoh (born 1976), Japanese musician with stage name Gotch.

See also
List of English words of Ukrainian origin

External links
Origins of the name Gotch